Lars Börgeling (born 16 April 1979, in Neuss) is a German pole vaulter.

His personal best is 5.85 metres, achieved in July 2002 in Leverkusen. This ranks him ninth among German pole vaulters, behind Tim Lobinger, Andrei Tivontchik, Michael Stolle, Danny Ecker, Richard Spiegelburg, Malte Mohr, Björn Otto and Raphael Holzdeppe.

Achievements

See also
 Germany all-time top lists - Pole vault

References

External links 
 
 Sporting Heroes

1979 births
Living people
German male pole vaulters
German national athletics champions
Athletes (track and field) at the 2004 Summer Olympics
Olympic athletes of Germany
European Athletics Championships medalists
Sportspeople from Neuss
21st-century German people